Wang Rui (born February 9, 1995, in Harbin) is a Chinese curler. She currently plays third on Team Han Yu, the Chinese National Women's Curling Team.

Career

Juniors
Wang represented China in four Pacific-Asia Junior Curling Championships, playing second for the team in 2011 and 2012 and third for the team in 2014 and 2015. The team would finish in 4th place in 2011, win a bronze in 2012, and silver in 2014 and 2015.

Women's
Wang first represented China at the women's level when she was a team member at the 2014 Ford World Women's Curling Championship. She played second on that team, skipped by Liu Sijia. The team finished the round robin with a 6–5 record, in 7th place and out of the playoffs. Later that year, she played at the 2014 Pacific-Asia Curling Championships, throwing lead rocks for the Liu rink. There, they would go on to win the gold medal. This earned the team a spot at the 2015 World Women's Curling Championship. The team finished the round robin with a 7–4 record in a tie with Scotland for the last playoff spot. They would lose to Scotland in the tiebreaker, settling for 5th place overall.

The following season, the team played in the 2015 Pacific-Asia Curling Championships, where they won a bronze medal, which meant that China did not qualify for the Worlds that season. Wang did not go home empty-handed that year, though, as she teamed up with Ba Dexin to represent China at the 2016 World Mixed Doubles Curling Championship. The pair would finish 2nd in their group, losing only one match, which was good enough to make the playoffs. They would defeat Denmark, Estonia, and Scotland before losing to Russia in the final, taking home silver medals.

Wang would join the Wang Bingyu rink as her third. They would win a gold medal at the 2017 Asian Winter Games and would represent China at the 2017 World Women's Curling Championship, finishing in 11th place.

Wang and Ba represented China in the mixed doubles tournament of the 2018 Winter Olympics and finished in fifth place. The pair finished the round robin with a 4–3 record but lost in a tiebreak match against Norway.

Wang threw fourth stones for the Chinese women's team in 2019, debuting at the 2019 World Qualification Event, which she won with teammates Mei Jie, Yao Mingyue and Ma Jingyi. This qualified China for the 2019 World Women's Curling Championship, which the team played in. There, the rink finished round robin with a 7–5 record and then lost in their quarterfinal match against Switzerland.

References

External links

1995 births
Living people
Chinese female curlers
Sportspeople from Harbin
Asian Games medalists in curling
Medalists at the 2017 Asian Winter Games
Asian Games gold medalists for China
Curlers at the 2017 Asian Winter Games
Olympic curlers of China
Curlers at the 2018 Winter Olympics
Pacific-Asian curling champions
Curlers at the 2022 Winter Olympics